Colin Raymond "Col" Bailey (born 1937 in Adelaide, South Australia) was an Australian naturalist and thylacine enthusiast. He was a firm believer in the continued existence of the species and wrote several books and many newspaper columns on the subject describing sightings.

Biography

Bailey was born in Adelaide and grew up on a farm in rural South Australia. Due to his remarkable interest in the tasmanian tiger he later moved to Tasmania where he resided for about 30 years until his death on February 25, 2022.

Bibliography
 Tiger Tales (2001)
 Shadow of the Thylacine (2010)
 Lure of the Thylacine (2013)

References

Australian naturalists
1937 births
Living people